Sonia Antinori (born in Viareggio on 23 April 1963) is an Italian playwright, actress, theater director and translator. She has studied visual arts, theater and ballet, and graduated from the University of Florence. Since 1990, she has been working in Italy and in other countries abroad. Her plays have been presented at several festivals and theaters, broadcast and translated into, among others, German, English, French, Spanish, Polish, Bosnian, Turkish.

Career

In 1998 she took part in The Colours of the Chameleon, a residential project at the Traverse Theatre in Edinburgh with her one act play Black (directed by Nick Bone). In 1999 Sonia was invited by the International Playwriting Festival at the Warehouse in East Croydon, where Brennan Street directed her Castle of Mud. 
She was invited to take part in various international workshops and presentations (Kulturforum Graz 1996, Festival Theaterformen Braunschweig 2000, University of Mainz 2001).

She has translated several plays from German and English into Italian (Arthur Schnitzler, Frank Wedekind, Ödön von Horváth, :de:Kerstin Specht, Werner Schwab, Thornton Wilder, Rona Munro, Georg Büchner, Matthieu Bertholet, Gareth Armstrong, Fritz Kater, Eugene O’Neill, Dylan Thomas, Dea Loher). In 2007 her Italian version of the play Volksvernichtung by Austrian playwright Werner Schwab has been awarded in Milan the :it:Premio Ubu, the most prestigious Italian Theatre Prize.

She has been teaching playwriting and acting at the Scuola Holden in Turin, at the University of Venice, the University of Urbino, the Scuola Teatri Possibili of Milan and the School of Teatro Stabile delle Marche, among many others. She also teaches in several workshops in Europe, South America and Africa.

Since 2006 she has been developing in association with Malte on various projects and events mostly focused on site specific research in the Marche Region.

Works

Her plays include: L'Ospite (1993), Maria Maddalena, Il sole dorme (1995), Il contagio, Berlinbabylon, Il castello di fango (Castle of Mud) (1997), Nel tempo insolito (Unusual time) (1998),  Nietzsche. La danza sull’abisso (2000), Trebus o il fenomeno dell’ombra (2002), Rosa la Rossa (2003), La Controra, Matakiterangi (Occhi che guardano il cielo), La Global Comedia (2005), Terra di Mezzanotte (2006), L’astratto principio della speranza (2007), Werther Project, Buio (2010).

Her works also include novels and short stories. Her works have been printed by several publishers.

In 2013 she initiated WISE (Workshop Identity: a Story about Europe), a European Project of Testimonial Theatre about Politics and Democracy, developing a collective modular dramaturgy (Politics taught to my grandchildren – a European Bildungsroman) which has been presented in the project's four partner countries (Italy, Germany, UK, Poland).

Books 
In 2012 Titivillus published her first collection of plays: 4. Trame agli angoli della Storia. Corazzano (Pisa) : Titivillus, 2012.

References

University of Florence alumni
1963 births
Italian stage actresses
Italian theatre directors
Italian women writers
Living people
20th-century Italian dramatists and playwrights
21st-century Italian dramatists and playwrights
Italian women dramatists and playwrights